Gustaf Emanuel Hildebrand Aulén (15 May 1879 – 16 December 1977) was the Bishop of Strängnäs in the Church of Sweden, a Lutheran theologian, and the author of Christus Victor, a work which still exerts considerable influence on contemporary theological thinking on the atonement.

Life

Aulén was born in 1879 in Ljungby parish, Kalmar County, Sweden to Rev. F.J. Aulén and Maria Hildebrand. He married Kristine Björnstad in 1907. After studying at Uppsala University, Aulén became professor of dogmatics at Lund University in 1913, then Bishop of Strängnäs in 1933.

Aulén's first major theological work was 'The Faith of the Christian Church', published in Swedish in 1923. His most famous work –Christus Victor – followed in 1930, with an English translation in 1931. 'The Faith of the Christian Church' was translated into English in 1948. Aulén's work gained international recognition  and most of his later works were quickly followed by English translations.

Aulén was also an avid composer, contributing profusely to the Swedish hymnbook. He was the president of the Royal Swedish Academy of Music 1944–1950.

Aulén retired his bishopric in 1952, returning to Lund to devote himself to his academic work. He published an autobiography – "My ninety-six years: happenings and thoughts" – in 1975 and died two years later on 16 December 1977 at the age of 98.

Theology
Aulén was a prominent member of the 'Lundensian' school of theology, along with Anders Nygren and Ragnar Bring. The Lundensian school perhaps resembles most closely that of neo-orthodoxy in the German-speaking and English-speaking theological scenes of the mid-20th century, with an emphasis on divine transcendence.

Two significant influences on Aulén's thinking were Martin Luther, whose work Aulén consistently praises, and Friedrich Schleiermacher, of whom Aulén is much more frequently critical.

Christus Victor
Aulén's most influential contribution to Theology was in the area of Atonement theory. His book Christus Victor has established itself as one of the key reference points in contemporary discussion.

Aulén identified three main theories of the Atonement: the 'scholastic' view, epitomised by Anselm of Canterbury (known as Satisfaction theory); the 'idealistic' view, epitomised by Peter Abelard (known as Moral Exemplar theory); and what he referred to as the 'classic' view.

Aulén advocated a return to this 'classic' view, which he characterised as follows:

He argued that both the other theories put too much emphasis on the work of humanity in the Atonement: the Moral Exemplar view wholly so, and Satisfaction Theory in its emphasis on "the service which Christ qua homo renders".

Regardless of whether they agree with his arguments, most contemporary discussions of the Atonement follow Aulén's three categories, and the term Christus Victor has become synonymous with the 'classic' view he advocated.

Studies and career
 Uppsala University:
Candidate of Philosophy 1899
Licenciate of Theology 1906
Doctor of Theology 1915
Lecturer of Theological Encyclopedia 1907
Lecturer of Dogmatism 1910
Lund University:
Professor of Systematic Theology 1913
Bishop of the Diocese of Strängnäs 1933

Bibliography
The Faith of the Christian Church. Swedish: 1923, English: 1948; 5th ed. 1952, English: 1960
Christus Victor: A Historical Study of the Three Main Types of the Idea of Atonement. Swedish: 1930, English: 1931
Church, Law and Society. Scribner, 1948.
Eucharist and Sacrifice. Swedish: 1956, English: 1958
Reformation and Catholicity. Swedish: 1959, English: 1961
The Drama and the Symbols. Swedish: 1970, English: 1970
Jesus in Contemporary Historical Research. Swedish: 1976, English: 1976

See also
Samfundet Nordens Frihet, where Aulén was a board member

References 

1879 births
1977 deaths
People from Kalmar Municipality
Swedish theologians
Lutheran bishops of Strängnäs
20th-century Lutheran bishops
20th-century Protestant theologians
Corresponding Fellows of the British Academy